The 1987 St. Louis Cardinals season was the team's 106th season in St. Louis, Missouri and the 96th season in the National League. The Cardinals went 95-67 during the season and finished first in the National League East Division for the third and last time before moving to the NL Central in 1994. They went on to win the NLCS in seven games over the San Francisco Giants. In the World Series against the Minnesota Twins, after having fallen behind 2-0 at the Hubert H. Humphrey Metrodome, they won their next three games at home. However, back at the Metrodome, they lost the last two and fell one game short of a World Series title. It would be the Cardinals' last World Series appearance until 2004.

Offseason
 October 31, 1986: Alan Knicely was released by the Cardinals.
 December 19, 1986: Bob Forsch was signed as a free agent by the Cardinals.
 January 26, 1987: Skeeter Barnes was signed as a free agent by the Cardinals.

Regular season
September highlights included a Terry Pendleton home run on a September 11 game against the contending Mets as well as a Tom Herr walk-off grand slam against the Mets on Seat Cushion Night.  As St. Louis proceeded into the post-season, they found themselves without clean-up hitter Jack Clark, the team's number-one offensive threat.  He damaged his ankle when he caught a cleat in the artificial turf at Montreal's Olympic Stadium.   Nonetheless, the Redbirds won 95 games to capture the NL East title.

Season standings

Record vs. opponents

Notable transactions
 April 1, 1987: Mike LaValliere, Mike Dunne and Andy Van Slyke were traded by the Cardinals to the Pittsburgh Pirates for Tony Peña.
 April 6, 1987: Lee Tunnell was purchased by the Cardinals from the Pittsburgh Pirates.
 June 2, 1987: Jeremy Hernandez was drafted by the Cardinals in the 2nd round of the 1987 Major League Baseball draft.
 July 16, 1987: Skeeter Barnes was purchased from the Cardinals by the Milwaukee Brewers.
 July 25, 1987: Joe Boever was traded by the Cardinals to the Atlanta Braves for Randy O'Neal.
 August 31, 1987: Pat Perry was traded to the Cincinnati Reds for a player to be named later.  On September 3, 1987 the Cincinnati Reds sent Scott Terry to the St. Louis Cardinals to complete the deal.
 September 29, 1987: Doug DeCinces was signed as a free agent with the St. Louis Cardinals.

Roster

Player stats

Batting

Starters by position
Note: Pos = Position; G = Games played; AB = At bats; H = Hits; Avg. = Batting average; HR = Home runs; RBI = Runs batted in

Other batters
Note: G = Games played; AB = At bats; H = Hits; Avg. = Batting average; HR = Home runs; RBI = Runs batted in

Pitching

Starting pitchers
Note: G = Games pitched; IP = Innings pitched; W = Wins; L = Losses; ERA = Earned run average; SO = Strikeouts

Other pitchers
Note: G = Games pitched; IP = Innings pitched; W = Wins; L = Losses; ERA = Earned run average; SO = Strikeouts

Relief pitchers
Note: G = Games pitched; W = Wins; L = Losses; SV = Saves; ERA = Earned run average; SO = Strikeouts

Postseason

NLCS

Despite the Cardinals prevailing over the San Francisco Giants in 7 games, it was the Giants' Jeffrey Leonard who won the NLCS MVP award.

Game 1
October 6, Busch Stadium

Game 2
October 7, Busch Stadium

Game 3
October 9, Candlestick Park

Game 4
October 10, Candlestick Park

Game 5
October 11, Candlestick Park

Game 6
October 13, Busch Stadium

Game 7
October 14, Busch Stadium

World Series

The Minnesota Twins defeated the Cardinals in seven games.  This Series was the first in which the home team won each of the seven games.  The Cardinals held their own at Busch Stadium, but the crowd noise and the "Homer Hankys" in the Metrodome appeared to give the Twins an edge.  The booming bats of the Twins were too much for the Cardinals' "inside baseball" style of offense in Games 1, 2, and 6.  In Game 7 it was the Twins' pitching that shut down the Cardinals.

AL Minnesota Twins (4) vs. NL St. Louis Cardinals (3)

Awards and honors
 Terry Pendleton, Third Base, National League Gold Glove
 Ozzie Smith, Shortstop, National League Gold Glove, Silver Slugger
 Jack Clark, First Base, National League Silver Slugger

Farm system

References

External links
1987 St. Louis Cardinals at Baseball Reference
1987 St. Louis Cardinals at Baseball Almanac

St. Louis Cardinals seasons
Saint Louis Cardinals season
National League East champion seasons
National League champion seasons
St Louis